CFRG-FM is a French language radio station that operates at 93.1 FM in Gravelbourg, Saskatchewan. It retains the call sign formerly used by CFRG, a now-defunct private affiliate of Radio-Canada which aired in Gravelbourg from 1952 to 1975.

The station was licensed by the Canadian Radio-television and Telecommunications Commission in 2003.

The station is a member of the Alliance des radios communautaires du Canada.

References

External links
CFRG official web site
 

FRG
FRG
FRG
Gravelbourg No. 104, Saskatchewan
Radio stations established in 2003
2003 establishments in Saskatchewan